Özyeğin University is a private, non-profit university located in Istanbul, Turkey.

History

The university was founded by the Hüsnü M. Özyeğin Foundation, and its establishment was approved by Foundation Act No. 5656, published in the Official Gazette No. 26526 on May 18, 2007.

Özyeğin University admitted its first class of students to the department of Business Administration and started its education in September, 2008.

According to the "Most Popular Universities" survey conducted by Bloomberg Business Week in 2014, Özyeğin ranked 3rd among foundation universities, following Sabancı and Koç universities, respectively. Özyeğin University was also placed 4th among all universities in the online survey conducted with 15.700 students from 89 universities between January and May 2014.

Özyeğin University ranked 6th among the Most Entrepreneurial and Innovative Universities of Turkey and rose in the ranking compared to 2013.

Campus
Altunizade Campus is the university's first campus, which was opened in June 2008. The university launched the main new campus in Çekmeköy, Istanbul. Later the building in Altunizade was evacuated and all departments moved to the Çekmeköy Campus in May 2013.

Organization and structure 
Özyeğin University aims to contribute to the development of Turkish society by producing original, creative, and valuable knowledge with its thoroughly modern education system, innovative structure, and service sector oriented education programs as well as being financially accessible to all students through an effective scholarship and financial support model.

Academics

Undergraduate 

 Faculty of Architecture and Design
 Architecture (English and Turkish)
 Communication Design
 Industrial Design
 Interior Architecture and Environmental Design
 Faculty of Business
 Banking and Finance
 Business Administration
 Economics
 Entrepreneurship
 International Business and Trade
 Management Information Systems
 Faculty of Engineering
 Civil Engineering
 Computer Science
 Electrical & Electronics Engineering
 Industrial Engineering
 Mechanical Engineering
 Natural and Mathematical Sciences
 Faculty of Law
 Law
 Faculty of Social Sciences (English and Turkish)
 International Relations
 Psychology
 School of Applied Sciences
 Gastronomy and Culinary Arts
 Hotel Management
 School of Aviation
 Air Transportation Management
 Professional Flight Program
 School of Languages
 Modern Languages Programs
 Preparatory English Program
 Undergraduate English Programs

Graduate 
 Graduate School of Business
 Entrepreneurship
 Executive MBA
 Financial Engineering and Risk Management, covered by the Graduate School of Engineering
 MBA
 PhD in Business
 Graduate School of Engineering
 Architecture
 Civil Engineering
 Computer Science
 Electrical & Electronics Engineering
 Industrial Engineering
 Mechanical Engineering
 Graduate School of Social Sciences
 Graduate Program for Design, Technology and Society (MA, PhD)
 Graduate Program for Law
 Graduate Program for Psychology

Notable alumni

 İrem Karamete (born 1993), Olympic fencer
 Tutya Yılmaz (born 1999), Olympic gymnast

See also 
 List of universities in Turkey
 Hüsnü Özyeğin
 Murat Ozyegin

References

External links
 Official website 
 Official website 
 Hüsnü M. Özyeğin Foundation 

Universities and colleges in Istanbul
Educational institutions established in 2007
Private universities and colleges in Turkey
2007 establishments in Turkey
Çekmeköy